"48 Hours" is a song by Blue System. It is the sixth track on their 1990 fourth studio album, Obsession. It was released as a single around six months before the album came out.

The single debuted at number 89 in Germany for the week of April 30, 1990, two weeks later re-entering at number 29, which would remain its highest position.

Composition 
The song is written and produced by Dieter Bohlen.

Charts

References

External links 
 

1990 songs
1990 singles
Blue System songs
Hansa Records singles
Songs written by Dieter Bohlen
Song recordings produced by Dieter Bohlen